The 1898–99 Kansas Jayhawks men's basketball team represented the University of Kansas in its first season of collegiate basketball. The head coach was James Naismith, the inventor of the game, who served his 1st year. The Jayhawks, who were not a member of a conference, finished the season 7–4.

Roster
Herbert Avery
Patrick E. Ducey
Willis Henderson
Henry Hess
Harold Hoyt
Frederick Owens
Claude Royal
Rusel Russell
Walter Sutton
William Sutton
William Yahn

Schedule

References

Kansas Jayhawks men's basketball seasons
Kansas
Jayhawk
Jayhawk